The Pecos Dandy is a 1934 American western film directed by Victor Adamson and Horace B. Carpenter and starring George J. Lewis, Dorothy Gulliver and Robert Walker. It was produced on Poverty Row as a second feature. It is now considered a lost film.

Synopsis
The Pecos Dandy falls in love with a woman but his attempts to win her her threatened when he is accused of horse theft by a rival.

Cast
 George J. Lewis as The Pecos Dandy
 Dorothy Gulliver as His Sweetheart		
 Betty Lee as Girl	
 Horace B. Carpenter
 Robert Walker	
 Clyde McClary 
 Victor Adamson

References

Bibliography
 Pitts, Michael R. Poverty Row Studios, 1929–1940. McFarland & Company, 2005.

External links
 

1934 films
1934 Western (genre) films
American Western (genre) films
Films directed by Horace B. Carpenter
Films directed by Victor Adamson
American black-and-white films
1930s English-language films
1930s American films